Miriam Cárdenas Cantú (born 8 October 1964) is a Mexican politician affiliated with the PRI. As of 2013 she served as Deputy of the LXII Legislature of the Mexican Congress representing Coahuila.

References

1964 births
Living people
Politicians from Coahuila
Women members of the Chamber of Deputies (Mexico)
Institutional Revolutionary Party politicians
21st-century Mexican politicians
21st-century Mexican women politicians
Autonomous University of Coahuila alumni
Autonomous University of Nuevo León alumni
Deputies of the LXII Legislature of Mexico
Members of the Chamber of Deputies (Mexico) for Coahuila